The Cockatoos: Shorter Novels and Stories is a collection of six novellas by Australian writer Patrick White, first published by Jonathan Cape in 1974. Cape reprinted the book that same year. This was White's first published work after winning the Nobel Prize for Literature.

The stories are copyright 1966, 1968 and 1974.

The third story, The Night the Prowler, was filmed in 1978. White wrote the script.

Contents
 A Woman's Hand
 The Full Belly
 The Night the Prowler
 Five-Twenty
 Sicilian Vespers
 The Cockatoos

External links
 The Complete Review on The Cockatoos.

Works by Patrick White
1974 short story collections
Australian novellas
Jonathan Cape books